Maurice Labro (21 September 1910 – 23 March 1987) was a French film director.

Filmography 
 1947: 
 1948: Three Boys, One Girl
 1949: The Heroic Monsieur Boniface 
 1950: 
 1951: The King of the Bla Bla Bla
 1951: The Sleepwalker
 1951: No Vacation for Mr. Mayor
 1952 Monsieur Leguignon, Signalman 
 1953: 
 1953: Saluti e baci
 1954: 
 1954: 
 1954: Leguignon the Healer
 1955: 
 1956: 
 1957: 
 1957: 
 1959: 
 1960: 
 1962: 
 1962: 
 1963: 
 1963: 
 1964: Coplan Takes Risks
 1965: Code Name: Jaguar
 1967: Casse-tête chinois pour le judoka
 1972:  (TV serial)

External links 
 

French film directors
People from Courbevoie
1910 births
1987 deaths